MicroRNA 517c is a microRNA that in humans is encoded by the MIR517C gene.

References

Further reading